The Trial of Henry Kissinger is a 2001 book by Christopher Hitchens examining the alleged war crimes of Henry Kissinger, the National Security Advisor and later United States Secretary of State for Presidents Richard Nixon and Gerald Ford. Acting in the role of the prosecution, Hitchens presents Kissinger's involvement in a series of alleged war crimes in Vietnam, Bangladesh, Chile, Cyprus and East Timor.

Summary
In the words of Hitchens, Kissinger deserves prosecution "for war crimes, for crimes against humanity, and for offenses against common or customary or international law, including conspiracy to commit murder, kidnap, and torture." He further calls him "a stupendous liar with a remarkable memory."

The book takes the form of a prosecutorial document, as Hitchens limits his critique to such charges as he believes might stand up in an international court of law following precedents set at Nuremberg and elsewhere. These link Kissinger to war casualties in Vietnam, massacres in Bangladesh and Timor and assassinations in Chile, Cyprus, and Washington, D.C.

The book takes a very negative view of Kissinger and calls for Americans to not ignore Kissinger's record. In the author's words, "They can either persist in averting their gaze from the egregious impunity enjoyed by a notorious war criminal and lawbreaker, or they can become seized by the exalted standards to which they continually hold everyone else."

Publication history
Highlights from the book were serialized in Harper's Magazine in February and March 2001.

The book was re-issued in 2012 by Atlantic Books and Twelve Books along with two other short books by Hitchens, The Missionary Position, a critique of Mother Teresa, and No One Left to Lie To, a criticism of the political maneuvering and personal character of President Bill Clinton.

Reception

Tim Walker of The Austin Chronicle lauded Hitchens as "a brilliant polemicist and a tireless reporter. Both sets of skills are on display throughout this book as he presents damning documentary evidence against Kissinger in case after case."

Vietnam War whistleblower Fred Branfman argued that "only a nation in deep spiritual and psychological disarray could honor a man with as much blood on his hands as Henry Kissinger" and wrote that "[Hitchens's] book deserves much wider attention." Keith Phipps of The A.V. Club praised the text as a "persuasive, damning account of Kissinger's activities as an international power-broker", and said that "by the time the author—using the same careful, if one-sided, reporting—implicates Kissinger in the planned assassination of a dissident Greek journalist, it seems well within the bounds of plausibility." In the Los Angeles Times, Warren I. Cohen said Hitchens "does a lawyerly job of demonstrating Kissinger's involvement" in the 1973 overthrow of Salvador Allende and "also spells out the American role in the Greek junta's attempt in 1974 to assassinate Archbishop Makarios, president of Cyprus, and catches Kissinger and Ford acquiescing in the Indonesian invasion of East Timor in 1975."

A month after Hitchens' death, John R. MacArthur of Harper's Magazine, while criticizing Hitchens's interventionism after the September 11 attacks, referred to The Trial of Henry Kissinger as a "landmark book".

Conversely, in a review for The Daily Telegraph, author George Jonas accused Hitchens of using devices improper to nonfiction, arguing that in one passage the author "admits he is guessing, but this does not prevent him from starting the paragraph by placing 'a tremor of anxiety' - ie, a consciousness of guilt - into Dr Kissinger's mind. This device might be acceptable in a novel - except this is not a novel."

Kissinger biographer Niall Ferguson regarded the book as "deeply flawed [and] based on very thin research".

Documentary film
The book inspired the 2002 documentary film The Trials of Henry Kissinger, which was co-written by Hitchens and fellow  writer/director, Alex Gibney. Hitchens makes an appearance in the film, being interviewed about Kissinger. The documentary also features film of Kissinger but only in archive footage.

See also 

 Seymour Hersh

References

External links
Washington Journal interview with Hitchens on his Harper's article, "The Case Against Henry Kissinger", January 22, 2001, C-SPAN
Presentation by Hitchens on The Trial of Henry Kissinger, June 28, 2001, C-SPAN

2002 non-fiction books
Non-fiction books adapted into films
Books by Christopher Hitchens
Political books
Henry Kissinger
Verso Books books